Robert Eric Guglielmone (born December 30, 1945) is an American prelate of the Roman Catholic Church, who served as bishop of the Diocese of Charleston in South Carolina from 2009 until 2022.

Biography

Early life and education
Robert Guglielmone was born on December 30, 1945, in New York City to Frank and Caroline Guglielmone. One of three children, he has two brothers, Nicholas and Tito. He was raised on Long Island and attended St. John's University in Queens, from where he obtained a Bachelor of Education degree. He then taught at Patchogue-Medford High School in Medford, New York, for five years while also doing his graduate work at New York University.

Guglielmone, feeling a call to the priesthood, entered Immaculate Conception Seminary in Huntington, New York, where he earned a Master of Divinity degree.

Priesthood
Guglielmone was ordained to the priesthood by Bishop John McGann for the Diocese of Rockville Centre on April 8, 1978. After his ordination, Guglielmone served as assistant pastor at St. Martin of Tours Parish in Amityville, New York, and at St. James Parish in Setauket, New York. In 1986, he was named director of pastoral formation and dean of seminarians at Immaculate Conception Seminary. Guglielmone was appointed pastor of St. Frances de Chantal Parish in Wantagh, New York, in 1993, and was raised to the rank of monsignor in 1996.

In 2003, after a grand jury report on the handling of sexual abuse cases in the Diocese of Rockville Centre, Bishop William Murphy named Guglielmone to be the diocesan director of clergy personnel. He was made rector of St. Agnes Cathedral in 2007.

Scouting involvement
Guglielmone is known for his substantial involvement in Scouting. He started his scouting career as camp chaplain at Onteora Scout Reservation in Livingston Manor, New York, during his time as a seminarian.  As a priest, he served as Scout chaplain for the Diocese of Rockville Centre, then for New York State and then as chaplain for the National Catholic Committee on Scouting.  Guglielmone served an eight-year term as chaplain of the International Catholic Conference on Scouting and the Holy See's global liaison to scouting programs. 

Guglielmone received the Silver Beaver Award from the Suffolk County Council.  He is member the Order of the Arrow.  There, he was inducted as a "Vigil Honor" member, the third and final degree of membership, in 1985.  Guglielmone's "Vigil Name" is "Nekama Auwen Allohumasin Lilenowag An Unt," which was interpreted as "He Who Exemplifies God's Law." He received the Silver Antelope Award from the Boy Scouts of America in 2004.  The National Catholic Committee on Scouting recognized Guglielmone with its "Brother Barnabas Founders Award" and in its first class of "Silver Saint George Emblem" recipients in 1998. In 2012, he received the Silver Buffalo Award.

Bishop of Charleston
On January 24, 2009, Guglielmone was appointed as the 13th Bishop of the diocese of Charleston by Pope Benedict XVI. He received his episcopal consecration on March 25, 2009, from Cardinal Edward Egan, with Bishops Murphy and Robert Baker serving as co-consecrators, at the Cathedral of St. John the Baptist in Charleston.

On August 14, 2019, Guglielmone was sued in New York State by a man claiming Guglielmone sexually abused him at age eight.  The abuse allegedly took place between 1978 and 1979 at St. Martin of Tours Church in Amityville when Guglielmone was assistant pastor.  Guglielmone denied the allegations.  The Diocese of Rockville Centre investigated the allegation and found it not credible. On December 8, 2020, the Vatican concluded its investigation and determined Guglielmone to be innocent of the charges.

Retirement 
Guglielmone submitted his letter of resignation as bishop of Charleston to Pope Francis in December 2020 at the mandatory age of 75. It was not accepted at that time.

On August 9, 2021, Guglielmone temporarily suspended Wilbroad Mwape, the pastor at St. Anthony of Padua Catholic Parish in Greenville, South Carolina.   A female parishioner had sued Mwape, claiming he manipulated her into a sexual relationship at Holy Trinity Parish in Orangeburg, South Carolina.  In December 2021, without commenting on the allegations, Guglielmone returned Mwape to St. Anthony.

On February 22, 2022, Francis accepted Gugliemone's resignation as Bishop of Charleston .

See also
 

 Catholic Church hierarchy
 Catholic Church in the United States
 Historical list of the Catholic bishops of the United States
 List of Catholic bishops of the United States
 Lists of patriarchs, archbishops, and bishops

References

External links
Roman Catholic Diocese of Charleston Official Site

Episcopal succession

{{|url=https://www.usccb.org/news/2022/pope-francis-accepts-resignation-bishop-robert-guglielmone-diocese-charleston-appoints |title=Pope Francis Accepts Resignation of Bishop Robert Guglielmone of Diocese of Charleston; Appoints Rev. Jacques Fabre, C.S. as Successor |accessdate=February 22, 2022}}

1945 births
Living people
St. John's University (New York City) alumni
New York University alumni
Roman Catholic Diocese of Rockville Centre
Roman Catholic bishops of Charleston
21st-century Roman Catholic bishops in the United States
Religious leaders from New York (state)